Mauro Ezequiel González (born 31 August 1996), commonly known as Mauro González is an Argentine professional footballer who plays for Deportes Temuco as a midfielder.

Club career

ŠK Slovan Bratislava
On 25 July 2015, ŠK Slovan Bratislava official website announced arrival of Mauro González on a one-year loan with option to buy from Boca Juniors. He made his professional Fortuna Liga debut for Slovan Bratislava against Spartak Myjava on 26 July 2015.

References

External links
 Historia de boca profile
 Futbalnet profile
 

1996 births
Living people
Argentine footballers
Argentine expatriate footballers
Association football midfielders
Boca Juniors footballers
Chacarita Juniors footballers
Club Almagro players
Club Atlético Temperley footballers
Club Atlético Patronato footballers
ŠK Slovan Bratislava players
Universidad de Concepción footballers
Cobresal footballers
Deportes Temuco footballers
Argentine Primera División players
Primera Nacional players
Slovak Super Liga players
Primera B de Chile players
Expatriate footballers in Chile
Argentine expatriate sportspeople in Chile
Expatriate footballers in Slovakia
Argentine expatriate sportspeople in Slovakia
Sportspeople from Lanús